Walter von Bülow-Bothkamp (1894-1918) was a German First World War fighter ace credited with 28 confirmed aerial victories. He began his aerial victory career in 1915, shooting down a couple of enemy airplanes in October. Transferred from France to the Middle East, he scored a couple of victories in Egypt during 1916. Shifted back to France in December, Bülow-Bothkamp joined a fighter squadron, Jagdstaffel 18. He shot down eight more enemy airplanes and an observation balloon by mid-1917. He then went to another fighter squadron, Jagdstaffel 36, to destroy two more observation balloons and 13 more enemy airplanes before being killed in action on 6 January 1918.

The victory list

Walter von Bülow-Bothkamp's victories are reported in chronological order, which is not necessarily the order or dates the victories were confirmed by headquarters.

This list is complete for entries, though obviously not for all details. Background data was abstracted from Above the Lines: The Aces and Fighter Units of the German Air Service, Naval Air Service and Flanders Marine Corps, 1914–1918, p. 74; and The Aerodrome webpage on Walter von Bülow-Bothkamp . Added facts are individually cited. Abbreviations were expanded by the editor creating this list.

Endnotes

References

Aerial victories of Bülow-Bothkamp, Walter von
Bülow-Bothkamp, Walter von